Cleopa is a given name. Notable people with the name include:

Cleopa Ilie (1912–1998), Romanian Orthodox monk
Cleopa Kilonzo Mailu (born  1956), Kenyan politician
Cleopa Msuya (born 1931), Tanzanian politician